Paul John Sapieha (1609–1665) was a Polish–Lithuanian nobleman (szlachcic).

Sapieha became a Hussar Rotmistrz in 1633, courtier in 1635, Obozny of Lithuania in 1638, Podstoli of Lithuania in 1645, voivode of the Vitebsk Voivodeship in 1646, voivode of the Vilnius Voivodeship and Great Hetman of Lithuania in 1656.

He participated in the Battle of Berestechko against Cossacks in 1651. During "The Deluge" he dislodged the Swedish troops from Lublin, took part in the siege of Warsaw and captured Tykocin Castle in 1657. Together with Stefan Czarniecki, he defeated the Russian army at the Battle of Polonka in 1660.

He was a supporter of the vivente rege elections.

He married Zofia Zienowicz, with whom he had two children: Teodora Aleksandra Sapieha and Michał Sapieha. He later married Anna Barbara Kopeć and had eight more children: John Casimir Sapieha, Benedykt Paweł Sapieha, Franciszek Stefan Sapieha, Leon Bazyli Sapieha, Katarzyna Anna Sapieha, Konstancja Sapieha, Zofia Sapieha and Teresa Sapieha.

1609 births
1665 deaths
Secular senators of the Polish–Lithuanian Commonwealth
Polish people of the Russo-Polish War (1654–1667)
Pawel Jan
Polish people of the Smolensk War
Great Hetmans of the Grand Duchy of Lithuania
Voivode of Vilnius